Geraldo Majella Agnelo (born 19 October 1933) is a Brazilian Roman Catholic Cardinal. He is Archbishop Emeritus of São Salvador da Bahia and Primate Emeritus of Brazil.

Early life and ordination
Agnelo was born in Juiz de Fora. He was ordained for the Archdiocese of São Paulo on 29 June 1957, and holds a doctorate in liturgy from the Pontifical Athenaeum of St Anselm, Rome.

Agnelo was director of the philosophical seminary, Aparecida. He was spiritual director and professor at Immaculate Conception Seminary, Ipiranga. He was professor of liturgical and sacramental theology at Pius XI Theological Institute, and rector of Our Lady of the Assumption Seminary.

Bishop
On 5 May 1978, Agnelo was appointed the second Bishop of Toledo, Paraná, and was consecrated on 6 August. On 4 October 1982, he was promoted to Archbishop of Londrina. Agnelo was President of the Brazilian Bishops' Liturgical Commission. On 16 September 1991, he was appointed Secretary of the Congregation for Divine Worship and the Discipline of the Sacraments. Agnelo was named Archbishop of São Salvador da Bahia on 13 January 1999.

Cardinal

In May 1999 Agnelo was nominated Vice President of the General Conference of Latin American Bishops (CELAM). He was Elected president of the National Conference of Brazilian Bishops in May 2003, and was made Cardinal-Priest of San Gregorio Magno alla Magliana Nuova (St. Gregory the Great at Magliana Nuova) by Pope John Paul II in the consistory of 21 February 2001.

Agnelo was one of the cardinal electors who participated in the 2005 papal conclave that selected Pope Benedict XVI, and was considered papabile himself at the time.

Agnelo resigned as Archbishop of São Salvador da Bahia on 12 January 2011, and was succeeded by Murilo Sebastião Ramos Krieger.

He was one of the cardinal electors who participated in the 2013 papal conclave that selected Pope Francis.

Curial membership (held until his 80th birthday):
Pontifical Council for the Pastoral Care of Migrants and Itinerants
Pontifical Commission for the Cultural Heritage of the Church

Views

2005 conclave
In April 2005, he said that he was very happy at the selection of Cardinal Joseph Ratzinger as the new Pope of the Catholic Church.

Catholic-Lutheran dialogue
Agnelo has supported efforts to improve dialogue between Lutherans and Catholics.

Abortion
Cardinal Agnelo expressed concern with Brazilian politicians over a plan to legalize abortion in the country.

References

External links
 
 Cardinal Agnelo bio

1933 births
Living people
20th-century Roman Catholic archbishops in Brazil
21st-century Roman Catholic archbishops in Brazil
Brazilian cardinals
Members of the Congregation for Divine Worship and the Discipline of the Sacraments
Brazilian people of Italian descent
Roman Catholic archbishops of São Salvador da Bahia
People from Juiz de Fora
Cardinals created by Pope John Paul II
Roman Catholic archbishops of Londrina
Roman Catholic bishops of Toledo, Brazil
Brazilian Roman Catholic archbishops